The 1993–94 Honduran Segunda División was the 27th season of the Honduran Segunda División.  Under the management of Edwin Pavón, C.D. Broncos won the tournament after finishing first in the final round (or Hexagonal) and obtained promotion to the 1994–95 Honduran Liga Nacional.

Final round
Also known as Hexagonal.

Standings

Known results

References

Segunda
1993